The 1986 IV ACB International Tournament "III Memorial Héctor Quiroga" was the 4th semi-official edition of the European Basketball Club Super Cup. It took place at Pabellón Municipal de Puerto Real, Puerto Real, Spain, on 5, 6 and 7 September 1986 with the participations of Cibona (champions of the 1985–86 FIBA European Champions Cup), FC Barcelona (champions of the 1985–86 FIBA European Cup Winner's Cup), Real Madrid (champions of the 1985–86 Liga ACB) and Tracer Milano (champions of the 1985–86 Serie A1 FIP). A month later, took place and an alternate and more official edition under the auspices of FIBA, between Cibona and FC Barcelona.

League stage
Day 1, September 05, 1986

|}

Day 2, September 06, 1986

|}

Day 3, September 07, 1986

|}

Final standings 

European Basketball Club Super Cup
1986–87 in European basketball
1986–87 in Spanish basketball
1986–87 in Italian basketball
1986–87 in Yugoslav basketball
International basketball competitions hosted by Spain